Saleh Aboulshamat (born 11 August 2002) is a Saudi Arabian footballer who plays as a midfielder for Al-Qadsiah.

Career
Saleh Aboulshamat started his career at the youth teams of Al-Ahli. He moved to Al-Qadsiah in 2017. On 5 November 2020, Aboulshamat signed his first professional contract with Al-Qadsiah. On 14 May 2021, Aboulshamat made his debut for Al-Qadsiah in the 1–0 loss against former club Al-Ahli.

References

External links
 
 

Living people
2002 births
Sportspeople from Jeddah
Association football midfielders
Saudi Arabian footballers
Saudi Arabia youth international footballers
Al-Ahli Saudi FC players
Al-Qadsiah FC players
Saudi Professional League players
Saudi First Division League players